The men's 100 metres event at the 1951 Pan American Games was held at the Estadio Monumental in Buenos Aires on 27 and 28 February.

Medalists

Results

Heats
Held on 27 February

Semifinals
Held on 28 February

Final
Held on 28 February

References

Athletics at the 1951 Pan American Games
1951